Clinton  is a city in Laurens County, South Carolina, United States. The population was 8,490 as of the 2010 census. It is part of the Greenville–Mauldin–Easley Metropolitan Statistical Area in upstate South Carolina. Clinton is the home of Presbyterian College.

History
The Cherokee Indians were Clinton's original inhabitants. The first settler to inhabit the area was John Duncan, a native of Aberdeen, Scotland, who arrived in 1752 from Pennsylvania and settled along a creek between the present-day towns of Clinton and Whitmire.

Scots-Irish immigrants from Pennsylvania, Maryland, and Virginia became the predominant settlers in the area in the two decades before the American Revolutionary War and took active part in a Revolutionary War battle in 1780 at nearby Musgrove Mill.

As late as 1852, the town was called Five Points because it arose at the intersection of four major roads and the railroad. It was named Clinton after Henry Clinton Young, a lawyer from the county seat of Laurens, who planned the first roads in the area.

As the railroad began to grow, so did the town, and more plots of land were developed around the railroad. With the population's growth came the establishment of the First Presbyterian Church in 1855.

In 1895, "factory fever" had struck the town of Clinton. This came with the establishment of the Clinton Cotton Mill in 1896 by Mercer Silas Bailey, owner of the town's leading dry goods store. Lydia Cotton Mill, also owned by the Baileys and their descendants, followed in 1902.  In 1933 there is a documented case of the lynching of an African American 35-year-old Norris Dendy in Clinton after he was arrested for killing a white man.

The mills continued to be a vital source of prosperity for Clinton until their closure in 2001 brought years of economic hardship from which the area is still struggling to emerge.

The Clinton Commercial Historic District, Duncan's Creek Presbyterian Church, and Thornwell-Presbyterian College Historic District are listed on the National Register of Historic Places.

Geography
Clinton is located at  (34.471257, -81.875023).  The city is concentrated around the intersection of U.S. Route 76 and South Carolina Highway 72, south of Spartanburg and northwest of Columbia.  Interstate 26 passes through the eastern portions of Clinton, and intersects Interstate 385 in the city's northern outskirts.

Demographics

2020 census

As of the 2020 United States census, there were 7,633 people, 3,141 households, and 1,585 families residing in the city.

2014-2015
As of the census taken in 2014, there were 8,619 people residing in Clinton, South Carolina. 96% of people live in urban areas, while the other 4% reside in rural areas. The population has grown 6.5% since 2000. 51.8% of the population is males (4,460) and 48.2% are females (4,159). The racial makeup of Clinton in 2015 was 58.9% White, 36.8% African American, 2.2% Hispanic, 0.6% Asian, and 0.2% American Indian. In 2015, the median age of all people in Clinton was 29.8. Native-born citizens, with a median age of 29.4, were generally younger than foreign-born citizens, with a median age of 33.1. For the population 15 years and over in Clinton 48.5% have never been married, 27.8% are now married, 4.1% are separated, 9.4% are widowed, and 10.1% are divorced.

The estimated median household income in 2015 was $29,342, but the average male's salary was $15,124 more than the average female's salary. Black or African American is the most likely racial or ethnic group to be impoverished in Clinton, SC. The mostly highly paid racial group is Asians who made 1.25 times what White workers made. The average median household in South Carolina in 2015 was $47,238. The estimated per capita income in 2015 was $15,108. 75.6% have acquired a High School diploma, 20.0% have acquired a bachelor's degree, and 8.9% have acquired a graduate or professional degree. 11.3% of the population in Clinton is unemployed. The mean travel time to work is 18.3 minutes. From 2014 to 2015, employment in Clinton, SC grew at a rate of 6.08%, from 3,025 employees to 3,209 employees. The median property value in Clinton grew to $92,100 from the previous year's value of $81,800. In Clinton 42.5% of housing units are owner-occupied, lower than the national average of 63.9%. This percentage grew from the previous year's rate of 41.9%.

Education

Laurens County School District 56 covers the southern part of Laurens County, including the town of Clinton. Eastside Elementary, Clinton Elementary, Joanna-Woodson Elementary, Clinton Middle School, and Clinton High School serve the town's students.

Both Clinton Middle School (formerly Bell Street Middle School) and Clinton High School have gained statewide and national attention for their Science Olympiad programs, with the middle school winning 20 of the 34 South Carolina Science Olympiad Division B competitions, including two in 1986-1987 and all 17 competitions since 2003. The high school has won nine of the last eleven State tournaments, from 2009–14 and 2016–18.

Clinton is also home of Presbyterian College and Thornwell Orphanage. Both institutions were founded by Presbyterian minister and philanthropist William Plumer Jacobs while he was the pastor at First Presbyterian Church of Clinton.

Media
The city of Clinton is host to two  media outlets that serve the community as well as  surrounding  Laurens County. The Clinton Chronicle is the local newspaper and only print media source in town; it publishes new editions weekly. Founded in 1900, the Chronicle is owned by Smith Newspapers, Inc., Fort Payne, Ala. Breaking news is published to www.clintonchronicle.com as well as www.myclintonnews.com, both  operated by The Clinton Chronicle staff and  updated regularly between editions.

The second form of media found in Clinton is the local radio station WPCC, 96.5 FM and 1410 AM. This radio station plays beach and easy listening music and offers sports broadcasts through a partnership with ESPN Radio and Motor Racing Network. WPCC is also affiliated with the Atlanta Braves radio network.

Government
Clinton operates under a council–manager form of government.  The incumbent Mayor is Comer H. "Randy" Randall; he was elected to a fourth non-consecutive term in March 2023, after having served three terms from 2002 to 2013. The City Manager is Tom Brooks, who was appointed to the position by the Mayor.

2023 election results

Source:

2021 election results

Source:

2019 election results

Source:

Notable people

 Cal Cooper (1922–1994), MLB pitcher
 Jackie K. Cooper (born 1941), author and film critic
 Claude Crocker (1924–2002), MLB pitcher
 Chick Galloway (1896–1969), MLB shortstop
 Kevin Long (born 1955), NFL running back
 Carl Anthony Payne II (born 1969), actor
 Johnny Riddle (1905–1998), MLB player
 Arthur Smith (1921–2014), guitarist and songwriter
 Charlie Wilson (1905–1970), MLB shortstop and third baseman

References

External links

 City of Clinton

Cities in South Carolina
Cities in Laurens County, South Carolina
Upstate South Carolina
1852 establishments in South Carolina
Populated places established in 1852